Sotos Zackheos (born 1950/51) is a Cypriot former ambassador and permanent secretary at the foreign ministry.

Sotos Zackheos has bachelor's degrees in Law, and in Economics and Political Sciences, from the University of Athens and a master's degree in Political Science from Stanford University in the United States.

Zackheos is a member of the board of directors of RCB Bank, formerly known as Russian Commercial Bank (Cyprus).

In December 2013, President Nicos Anastasiades appointed Zackheos as the Special Envoy of the President of Cyprus to Russia.

References

1950s births
Living people
Cypriot diplomats
National and Kapodistrian University of Athens alumni
Stanford University alumni